John McMaster may refer to:

 John McMaster (footballer, born 1893) (1893–1954), Scottish footballer (Celtic FC)
 John McMaster (footballer, born 1955), Scottish footballer (Aberdeen FC)
 John McMaster (mayor) (1830–1924), mayor of Brisbane
 John Bach McMaster (1852–1932), American historian

See also
 John H. McMasters (1939–2008), American aeronautical engineer